The Supply Chain Act (literally Obligation to Exercise Due Diligence in the Supply Chain Act or  in short) is a German law requiring companies to monitor human rights and environmental risks in their supply chains.

Summary 
The law requires companies to carry out analyses on supply chain contracts to identify risks to human rights and requires companies to take action against identified risks. The companies will have to publish an annual report containing the analyses. Companies must also establish a complaint procedure for workers to report potential risks. The law additionally gives civil society organisations the ability to sue companies on behalf of workers over breaches of human rights in supply chains. Companies that fail to respect the terms of the law can face fines of up to two percent of the company's annual revenues.

The came into effect starting with 2023, only applying to companies with over 3000 employees in its first year. In 2024, the provisions of the law will extend to apply to all companies with over 1000 employees. In 2026, the federal government will carry out an evaluation of the law's effectiveness.

Legislative history 
The German federal cabinet proposed the law on 3 March 2021. It had originally been planned to be introduced in 2020, but negotiations were required between the government's coalition partners, with the Social Democratic Party of Germany eventually backing down on including small companies in the law after opposition from the CDU/CSU.

Reactions  
Human Rights Watch supported the passing of the law, stating that "the law is an important step toward meaningful corporate accountability" but that "it does not incorporate the highest international standards."

The Confederation of German Employers' Associations opposed the law, arguing that it was too strict, that it would force companies to stop operations in regions with poor human rights records, and that "foreign companies that do not have to comply with the German rules will jump in and replace German companies."

References 

Law of Germany
2021 in Germany
Politics of Germany
Human rights legislation